Loudness, K-weighted, relative to full scale (LKFS) is a standard loudness measurement unit used for audio normalization in broadcast television systems and other video and music streaming services.

LKFS is standardized in ITU-R BS.1770. In March 2011, the International Telecommunication Union (ITU) introduced a loudness gate in the second revision of the recommendation, ITU-R BS.1770-2. In August 2012, the ITU released the third revision of this recommendation ITU-R BS.1770-3. In October 2015, the ITU released the fourth revision of this recommendation ITU-R BS.1770-4.

Loudness units relative to full scale (LUFS) is a synonym for LKFS that was introduced in EBU R 128. 

The EBU has suggested that the ITU should change the unit to LUFS, as LKFS does not comply with scientific naming conventions and is not in line with the standard set out in ISO 80000-8. Furthermore, they suggest the symbol for loudness level, k-weighted should be Lk, which would make Lk and LUFS equivalent when LUFS indicates the value of Lk with reference to digital full scale.

LKFS and LUFS are identical in that they are both measured in absolute scale and both equal to one decibel (dB).

Loudness units (LU) is an additional unit used in EBU R128. It describes Lk without direct absolute reference and therefore describes loudness level differences.

References

Sound technology